Selena Karlson (born 13 August 1998) is a retired Australian rules footballer who played for  and  in the AFL Women's competition (AFLW). She was drafted by the Western Bulldogs with the 34th pick overall in the 2018 AFLW draft. Karlson made her AFLW debut in round 4 of the 2019 season. She signed to St Kilda in the expansion signing period in April 2019. In March 2021, Karlson retired after several injuries prevented her from making a senior appearance for St Kilda.

References

External links 

Living people
1998 births
Australian rules footballers from Victoria (Australia)
Western Bulldogs (AFLW) players